is a Japanese original net animation and promotional anime series for the card and video games of the same name. The series premiered on July 1, 2018, and was produced by Toei Animation without the involvement of Dragon Ball creator Akira Toriyama. 

The series is set outside of the main continuity and explores several alternate scenarios within the franchise.

Plot
Following the Tournament of Power, a mysterious figure named Fu, who after kidnapping Future Trunks, lures Goku and Vegeta to the Prison Planet, an experimental area which Fu created and has filled with strong warriors from different planets and eras in order to force them into a game where they must collect the seven Special Dragon Balls if they wish to escape.

The Prison Planet was only the beginning of Fu's experiments... Based on the experimental data collected at the Prison Planet, Fu finally begins his real experiment! What is Fu's real goal, and what is his real power? Goku and companions from "Dark Demon Realm Mission" and "Universe Mission" appear! An experiment involving the whole universe and space-time!

After Fu's defeat, warriors and fighters from all over the space-time gather to participate in the Space-Time Ultra Tournament planned by Aeos, the former Supreme Kai of Time. Goku and his allies will face very powerful opponents.

Release

In May 2018, V Jump announced a promotional anime for Super Dragon Ball Heroes that will adapt the game's Prison Planet arc. The first episode was shown at Aeon Lake Town, a shopping mall in Koshigaya, Saitama, on July 1, 2018, and was uploaded to the game's official website that same day. Likewise, the second episode was shown at Jump Victory Carnival Tokyo Kaijō on July 16, 2018, before being uploaded to the website.

Reception
According to Comicbook.com, initial reactions to the series from Dragon Ball fans base were mixed.

References

External links
 Universe Mission official website (in Japanese)
 Big Bang Mission official website (in Japanese)
 
 

Dragon Ball anime
Toei Animation television
2018 anime ONAs
Anime and manga about parallel universes
Anime series based on manga
Television series set on fictional planets